Ftericha is a small village in Kyrenia District in Cyprus, located southeast of Karavas. It is under the de facto control of Northern Cyprus.

References

Communities in Kyrenia District
Populated places in Girne District